Armenians in the Baltic states of Estonia, Latvia, and Lithuania settled there mostly during the Soviet occupation of the Baltic States.

Estonia
According to the year 2000 census, there were 1,444 Armenians living in Estonia. According to the 2011 census, the number of Armenians had decreased slightly to 1,042. In 1989 (according to Soviet 1989 census) the number was 1,669. The majority of Armenians live in Tallinn: 58% in the year 2000.

With the affirmation of Estonia's independence from the Soviet Union in 1991, Soviet-era immigrants and their Estonian-born children were not granted citizenship automatically.

A football club based in Tallinn, FC Ararat Tallinn, is named after the mountain Ararat and has a partnership with the Armenian club FC Ararat Yerevan.

Latvia
Armenians in Latvia number around 5,000 according to armeniandiaspora.com and 2,742 according to Latvian yearly statistics of 2008.
The Armenians live mainly in Riga.

In 1887 had established Latvian Armenian Society. One Armenian was reported in the Jäger Report as murdered by Einsatzgruppe A in Daugavpils in 1941. In 1990, in the center of Riga had been set a khachkar. In 1991, the first issue of the newspaper "Ararat". In 2001, Armenian community of Riga had established. In 2002, the publishing of the newspaper “Ararat” had resumed.

Lithuania

According to the last Lithuanian census of 2011 there were 1,233 Armenians in Lithuania. Armenian organizations put the number around 2,500. According to Soviet 1989 census there are 1,655 Armenians in Lithuania. The Armenians live mainly in Vilnius. The settlement of Armenians in Lithuania, in the distant past of the Polish–Lithuanian Commonwealth was of an episodic nature and was due mainly to the needs of trade, although from the historical sources it is known, that Armenian school was established in 16th century Vilnius, Armenian guild in the 16th to 18th centuries Vilnius. One of the most prominent painter of the 19th century in Lithuania was Jan Rustem (Armenian: Յան Ռուստամ). The history of most of the Armenian community now living in Lithuania mainly occurs in the 20th century.

Famous Baltic Armenians
 Arturs Akopjans
 Alan Melikdjanian
 Asmik Grigorian
 Boris Parsadanian
 Stefan Airapetjan

See also 
 Armenia-Lithuania relations

References

External links
 Eastern Minorities//Latvian Institute
 Baltic “yans”: A visit with the Armenians of Latvia
 Армяне в Латвии. От общества — к общине

Baltic states
Ethnic groups in Estonia
Ethnic groups in Lithuania
Ethnic groups in Latvia